The Xizhi Gongbei Temple is a traditional Taoist temple  located on Sanxiu Mountain in Xizhi District, New Taipei, Taiwan. Zhenren Lü Dongbin, known locally as Hianggong, is the principal Deity worshiped at Xizhi Gongbei Temple. Every year, from late November to late December, the temple is also a popular tourist spot for maple viewing. There are various hiking trails around the Xizhi Gongbei Temple. The cityscape of downtown Xizhi and the mountains in the distance can be viewed after following the stone steps up to the Chuanliu Pavilion.

History
Xizhi Gongbei Temple was first built during the Japanese rule in 1906. Since then, it has been reconstructed four times. Its last reconstruction started in 1960 and was completed in 1966.

Transportation
The temple is accessible by Xizhi railway station of Taiwan Railways.

Gallery

See also
 Lü Dongbin
 Zhinan Temple (指南宮), Taipei, Taiwan
 List of temples in Taiwan
 Religion in Taiwan

References

External links

1906 establishments in Taiwan
Religious buildings and structures completed in 1966
Taoist temples in Taiwan
Temples in New Taipei